Pouteria furcata is a species of plant in the family Sapotaceae. It is endemic to Brazil.  It is threatened by habitat loss.

References

Flora of Brazil
furcata
Vulnerable plants
Taxonomy articles created by Polbot